A. Nallathambi may mean 

 A. Nallathambi (ADMK politician) from Gangavalli, Tamil Nadu
 A. Nallathambi (DMK politician) from Tirupattur, Tamil Nadu